The Djønno Tunnel is a road tunnel in the municipality of Ulvik in Vestland county, Norway. The tunnel was opened in 1981 to create a road connection along the Eid Fjord to Djønno, which was previously accessible only by boat. The branch of the Vallavik Tunnel connecting to the Hardanger Bridge passes directly over the Djønno Tunnel.

References

Ulvik
Road tunnels in Vestland